"The Rye" is the 121st episode of the NBC sitcom Seinfeld. It was the 11th episode of the seventh season, originally airing on January 4, 1996. It was written by American comedian Carol Leifer. In this episode, Elaine's relationship with her saxophonist boyfriend is complicated by the issue of oral sex, George tries to avert a feud between his parents and his fiancée Susan's parents over a marble rye bread, and Kramer takes on a temporary job as a hansom cab driver.

Plot
Elaine dates a jazz saxophonist named John Jermaine, but tells Jerry that John does not give her oral sex. Jerry meets Clyde, one of Jermaine's bandmates, and describes the relationship to him as "hot and heavy". When Elaine hears of this, she is upset with Jerry as this line makes her seem more into the relationship than John might be comfortable with.

George's parents Frank and Estelle meet his fiancé Susan's parents for the first time at the Ross house. Frank brings a marble rye bread. After an uncomfortable dinner, Frank takes the rye back because they did not serve it. George wants to sneak an identical rye bread into the Rosses' kitchen, creating the illusion that the bread was simply misplaced and thus averting a long-running family feud over the bread. Kramer is picking up a hansom cab driver's mail for the week, in exchange for which he is allowing him the use of his cab. George plots to send Mr. & Mrs. Ross on a hansom cab ride as a wedding anniversary present, while he and Jerry sneak in the rye. At the bakery, an elderly lady in line in front of Jerry gets the last marble rye. After trying unsuccessfully to get it from her with bribery and appeals to sympathy, Jerry robs it from her.

Kramer, having overbought at the warehouse club, feeds the horse some "Beef-A-Reeno". This makes the horse flatulent to the point the Rosses cannot bear it, and cut their trip short, preventing Jerry from delivering the stolen rye bread. After trying unsuccessfully to toss the bread up to George at the third floor window, Jerry hooks it to a fishing pole George found in the room. George reels the rye bread up but is caught by the Rosses.

Elaine explains to John about the "hot and heavy" line. John tells her he was happy Clyde told him that and offers to give her oral sex. After trying too hard to perform cunnilingus on Elaine, his lips became so numb that he can not make a note during a showcase for record producers, making a series of off-key whistles instead. Elaine leaves the show in embarrassment.

Production
Writer Carol Leifer got the story of visitors bringing a rye bread and then taking it back after the hosts forgot to serve it from a high school friend. The plot point of Jerry having to steal a marble rye bread from the woman ahead of him in line at the bakery was contributed by Seinfeld co-creator Larry David.

Elaine's voice-over in the opening scene was recorded by actress Julia Louis-Dreyfus beforehand and played back during filming of the scene so that she could synchronize her facial expression and movements with the narration. Many of the outdoor scenes were filmed at Paramount Studio, where Jerry Seinfeld started a massive snowball fight with the entire cast and crew using the fake snow.

In initial drafts of the episode's script, Kramer fed the horse excessive amounts of Chef Boyardee Beefaroni, causing its flatulence. However, Boyardee refused to allow their product to be portrayed in such a fashion, leading to the creation of the fictional product "Beef-a-reeno".

Critical reception 
Sara Lewis Dunne, in the book Seinfeld: Master of Its Domain, comments on possible reasons why the Costanzas and the Rosses clash:

David Sims of The A.V. Club "was in general disappointed with the return of the Ross family here, especially with the juicy setup of them meeting the equally bonkers Costanzas." He thought that the episode The Cheever Letters was stronger: "the whole thing feels more like your classic in-law dinner from Hell rather than the special kind of crazy we might come to expect. But The Rye redeems itself somewhat with the much wackier sight of Jerry stealing a marble rye from an old lady and trying to toss it to George on a second-floor [sic; it was third-floor] window..."

References

External links
 

Seinfeld (season 7) episodes
1996 American television episodes
Rye breads